Rufino Dompao Tima Jr. (born January 7, 1975), popularly known as Raffy Tima, is a Filipino journalist, producer and presenter. He is currently working in GMA Network and its affiliate, GMA News TV (now GTV), he spanned over 23 years since the working of his current network.

Early life
Raffy Tima was born as Rufino Dompao Tima Jr. on January 7, 1975, in Tabuk, Kalinga. He moved in Pasig and Quezon City for focused on news television after graduated in college. He finished the secondary education in San Marcelino High School, and his tertiary education in UP Diliman from 1st year to 2nd year, but he transferred to Trinity University of Asia from 3rd year until his graduation, with Bachelor of Arts in Mass Communication.

Career
Before his joining in IBC and GMA News, he was a voice-over of Philippine variety show, That's Entertainment.

Tima was one of GMA Network's main reporter during the 2000 to 2004 series of kidnappings by the Abu Sayyaf Group, an Islamic extremist group in southern Mindanao, and the all-out war waged by the Armed Forces of the Philippines against the Islamic separatist Moro Islamic Liberation Front in Central Mindanao. Tima has also covered the War in Afghanistan in 2001 and Iraq in 2004.

A recipient of numerous commendations including most outstanding news producer in 2004 for his coverage of that year's general elections, Tima is currently a senior producer for GMA news, an anchor on GMA News TV's noontime programme Balitanghali with Pia Arcangel (now Connie Sison), and presenter on the public affairs show, 100% Pinoy!. He is likewise one of the first presenters of Reporter's Notebook as well as on i-Witness, which won the Peabody Award.

Portrayals in media
Tima was featured in an episode of GMA News TV's drama anthology Wagas on August 9, 2014, before the proposal of set from Amaya. JC Tiuseco starred the role of Tima.

Personal life
Tima is married to fellow GMA News Reporter Mariz Umali on December 8, 2012. On January 1, 2012, celebrate the New Year's Day, Tima proposes to Umali in the party after two years as a couple. According to the story of television drama series, Wagas, Tima was set of epic fantaserye Amaya before proposal to her.

Filmography

References

External links
Raffy Tima on GMA News Online

1975 births
Living people
Filipino television journalists
IBC News and Public Affairs people
GMA Network personalities
GMA Integrated News and Public Affairs people